Roger de Beauchamp  was an English politician.

He was a Member (MP) of the Parliament of England for New Shoreham in 1295, 1300 and 1303.

References

13th-century births
14th-century deaths
English MPs 1295
English MPs 1300
English MPs 1303